

Events
The first barrel murders are discovered in New York. 
The Unione Siciliana, a fraternal organization providing support for Sicilian immigrants, is officially established in Chicago, Illinois. 
Sicilian Don Giuseppe Balsamo, supposedly the first American "Godfather", immigrates to the United States arriving in New York from Sicily. He eventually establishes criminal operations in several Italian neighborhoods of Brooklyn. 
Frank Costello arrives with his family in New York. Settling on 108th Street, his family begins running a small grocery store.
James Colosimo immigrates to Chicago, Illinois from Calabria, Italy

Arts and literature

Births
Machine Gun Kelly, Prohibition era gangster
James Belcastro, Chicago Outfit enforcer
Frank Cucchiara (Frank Russo) "Frank Caruso"; "Frank the Spoon", Patriarca crime family member, gambling racketeer and drug trafficker
Stephen Franse, NYPD police informant
Edward Vogel, "Dutch"; "Five-by-Five", Chicago mobster associated with the Chicago Outfit involved in illegal gambling and slot machine industry in Cook County, Illinois

Deaths

References 

Years in organized crime
Organized crime